Emma Orr (born 6 April 2003)  is a Scottish rugby player from Biggar who plays for the Scotland women's national rugby union team and the Scotland women's national rugby sevens team. Currently plays club rugby for Heriots Blues Women in the Scottish Premiership.

Club career 
Orr played for Biggar RFC, where her family are widely involved in the team. Her sister and brothers have also represented the club. In 2022, she played in the Biggar team which won the National Plate. Post World Cup, Orr joined Heriots Blues Women who compete in the Scottish Premiership.

International career 
Orr made her Scotland sevens debut at the age of 18 in the Rugby Europe Championship in Lisbon in June 2021, in which Scotland finished 5th.
Still aged 18, Orr made her Scotland women’s team debut against Wales during the 2022 Women’s Six Nations, winning three caps during the tournament.
She was selected to represent the Scotland women’s 7s team at the Toulouse leg of the World Sevens Series in May 2022  and for the squad for the 2022 Commonwealth Games in Birmingham. In December 2022 she was awarded a professional contract by Scottish Rugby.

References

External links 

 Emma Orr Scottish Rugby Profile Page

2003 births
Living people
Scottish rugby union players
Rugby sevens players at the 2022 Commonwealth Games
Scotland women's international rugby union players